The International Hotel School, is located in South Africa, and is an approved Centre of the City & Guilds International organisation; recognised in 120 countries worldwide. The school provides education for the hospitality industry, a broad category of fields within the service industry that includes lodging, food and drink service, event planning, theme parks, travel and tourism.

References

External links 
/ Official Site

Higher education in South Africa
Hospitality schools